The name Faith has been used for four tropical cyclones worldwide: one in the Atlantic Ocean, two in the Western Pacific Ocean and one in the Australian Region.

Atlantic:
 Hurricane Faith (1966) – a long-lived Cape Verde hurricane and was the sixth named storm and fifth hurricane of the 1966.

Western Pacific:
 Tropical Storm Faith (1947) –  a strong tropical storm minimal affected Taiwan and Japan.
 Typhoon Faith (1998) – struck both the Philippines and Vietnam during December 1998.

Australian region:
 Cyclone Faith (1972) – a Category 1 tropical cyclone (Australian scale) impact Queensland.

Pacific typhoon set index articles
Australian region cyclone set index articles